Matías González (born 4 July 1990) is an Argentine professional footballer who plays as a forward for Atlético Camioneros.

Career
González began his senior career in 2012 with Racing Club of the Argentine Primera División, appearing on the first-team's bench once in June 2012 versus Vélez Sarsfield. He departed in the following August to sign for Ferro Carril Oeste in Primera B Nacional, with them he made his professional debut on 10 September in a goalless draw at home to Almirante Brown. One further appearance followed prior to González leaving Ferro to join El Porvenir at the conclusion of the 2012–13 campaign. He went onto play twenty times and score one goal for El Porvenir in Primera D.

In January 2015, González completed a move to Torneo Federal B's Ben Hur. He would leave almost three years later in November 2017, after scoring fourteen goals in fifty-six matches for Ben Hur. In November 2017, González returned to professional football with Primera B Metropolitana side San Telmo. His debut arrived on 14 March 2018 against Sacachispas. Atlético Camioneros of Torneo Federal A signed González in the following July.

Career statistics
.

References

External links

1990 births
Living people
Footballers from Santa Fe, Argentina
Argentine footballers
Association football forwards
Argentine Primera División players
Primera Nacional players
Primera D Metropolitana players
Primera B Metropolitana players
Racing Club de Avellaneda footballers
Ferro Carril Oeste footballers
El Porvenir footballers
Club Sportivo Ben Hur players
San Telmo footballers